The eighty-sixth Minnesota Legislature first convened on January 6, 2009 and ended upon the beginning of the next Legislature in January 2011. The 67 members of the Minnesota Senate were elected during the 2006 General Election, and the 134 members of the Minnesota House of Representatives were elected during the 2008 General Election.

Sessions
Two special sessions were held.  The first was for several hours on May 17, 2010, to complete a budget bill.  The second special session was held October 18, 2010, to provide disaster relief to flood areas in Southern Minnesota.

Party summary 
Resignations and new members are discussed in the "Membership changes" section, below.

Senate

House of Representatives

Leadership

Senate 
President of the Senate
James Metzen (DFL-South St. Paul)

Senate Majority Leader
Lawrence Pogemiller (DFL-Minneapolis)

Senate Minority Leader
David Senjem (R-Rochester)

House of Representatives 
Speaker of the House
Margaret Anderson Kelliher (DFL-Minneapolis)

House Majority Leader
Anthony Sertich (DFL-Chisholm)

House Minority Leader
Until June 24, 2009 Marty Seifert (R-Marshall)
From June 24, 2009 Kurt Zellers (R-Maple Grove)

House Members

Members, 2009-2010

Senate Members

Members: 2009-2010

Membership changes

Senate

References

Majority and Minority Leaders of the Minnesota House of Representatives, 1901-present
Minnesota Legislators Past and Present, 86th Session

Results of Special Elections for the Minnesota Legislature, 1971-present

86th
2009 in Minnesota
2010 in Minnesota
2009 U.S. legislative sessions
2010 U.S. legislative sessions